Anastasia Dmitriyevna Gasanova (born 15 May 1999) is a Russian tennis player.
Gasanova has a career-high singles ranking by the WTA of 121, achieved on 10 January 2022. She also has a career-high WTA ranking of 252 in doubles, reached on 29 August 2022.

Early life
Gasanova was born in Saratov, Russia on 15 May 1999. Her mother Svetlana is a tennis coach.

Anastasia started playing tennis at the age of three, with her mother being her first coach.
Since 2013, she has been coached by both her mother and former WTA player Elena Bryukhovets.

Career
Gasanova made her WTA Tour main-draw debut at the 2021 Abu Dhabi Open by defeating Ena Shibahara in the final qualifying round. She scored her first ever top-ten win in the second round of that tournament, defeating former world No. 1, Karolína Plíšková, in straight sets.

In March 2021, at the St. Petersburg Trophy, Gasanova made it to her first quarterfinal of a WTA Tour event, after qualifying for the main draw. Her first-round match against Katarina Zavatska, and second-round win against Anastasia Pavlyuchenkova both broke the three hour mark and made it to the Marathon Marvels 2021: The longest matches of the year WTA list. At the same time, her match against Pavluchenkova made it to Great Escapes 2021: Winning from match point down. Gasanova lost the quarterfinal to Vera Zvonareva.
In October 2021, Anastasia's victorious match against Jil Teichmann in the first round of the Transylvania Open also made it to the WTA's Great Escapes 2021: Winning from match point down. The Russian player saved two match points and got her third victory against a top-50 player in 2021, with a score of 4-6, 6-0, 7-5.

At the 2022 French Open, she made her major debut as a lucky loser, replacing American player Lauren Davis.

Personal life 
Gasanova stands with Vladimir Putin and Russia in the Invasion of Ukraine. After eight months of conflict, she broke her silence with social media narratives of Russian propaganda.

ITF Circuit finals

Singles: 12 (6 titles, 6 runner-ups)

Doubles: 12 (3 titles, 9 runner–ups)

Head-to-head records

Top 10 wins

References

External links
 
 

1999 births
Living people
Russian female tennis players
Sportspeople from Saratov